Fulfillment of telecommunications services involves a series of supply chain activities responsible for assembling and making services available to subscribers. These activities delineate an operational infrastructure whose efficiency relies upon its ability to allow a communications service provider (CSP) to match the supply of services with demand in an economical way and with consistently high levels of quality and reliability.

To achieve these goals, the design of service fulfillment platforms take into consideration the following:

 Data transparency Making data available across the enterprise, regardless of source, while keeping it accurate
 Process mechanization/automation Completing more processes quicker and more successfully for better business performance
 Inventory management Understanding the status of inventory to ensure supply will be available to meet forecast (or actual) demand
 Asset monetization Driving enterprise valuation with the efficient use of assets

Processes 

The supply chain activities in service fulfillment involve the following processes:

 Service design and cataloging
 Integrated inventory management
 Network configuration and capacity assignment
 Service order entry, decomposition, workflow tracking and fallout resolution
 Service order activation

Subscriber expectations 

Keeping up with increasing subscriber expectations in today's market is not the exclusive domain of service assurance. Service fulfillment plays a critical role as well in ensuring a "first time right" customer experience.

Customer satisfaction in the telecommunications industry stems from adequate service provisioning, value for money, loyalty and relationship management. An efficient service fulfillment platform automates service order processing to gain speed via flowthrough capabilities and to reduce the service order fallout that results from manual processes. This is being recognized by CSPs as they increasingly look to their suppliers for help in achieving higher levels of automation.

Vendors 

Notable global service fulfillment vendors include Netcracker Technology, Comarch, Cisco, Telcordia (now part of Ericsson), TIBCO, Alcatel-Lucent (now part of Nokia), Amdocs, Oracle, Comptel  (now part of Nokia), HP, Tecnotree, Arkipelago and Ericsson.

See also
Service assurance

References 

Telecommunication services